This is a list of films depicting Colombia or specific aspects of it, such as its role in the illegal drug trade or its internal conflict. It is very common that those films (i.e. Collateral Damage, Mr. & Ms. Smith, XXX) fail in the reproduction of the country: some of these mistakes include showing Bogotá or Medellín as sylvatic or coastal regions, using Mexican or Cuban actors (different from Colombians, especially in accent), and a general inaccuracy regarding the depiction of how the conflicts between government and drug-trading cartels work.

English
American Made
Bedazzled
Behind Enemy Lines: Colombia
Blow
Bruce Almighty
Clear and Present Danger
Collateral Damage
Colombiana
Delta Force 2: The Colombian Connection
Encanto
The Godfather Part III
Green Ice
Licence to Kill
Lord of War
Love in the Time of Cholera
Loving Pablo
Memoria
Miami Vice
Mr. & Mrs. Smith
Predator 2
Proof of Life
Romancing the Stone
The Specialist
Superman III
XXX

See also

List of Colombian films
Colombian diaspora

 
Colombia
Colombia
Depicting
Films